The 2019–20 Utah Jazz season was the 46th season of the franchise in the National Basketball Association (NBA), and the 41st season of the franchise in Salt Lake City. It was announced that longtime Memphis Grizzlies point guard Mike Conley was traded to the Jazz after spending his first 12 seasons in the league with the Grizzlies. During the offseason Dennis Lindsey was promoted from General Manager to Executive Vice President of Basketball Operations, while Assistant Justin Zanik was promoted to General Manager.

The season was indefinitely suspended by the league officials following the games of March 11, 2020 after it was reported that Rudy Gobert tested positive for COVID-19. A day later, on March 12, it was revealed that Donovan Mitchell had also tested positive for the virus. Before this, Gobert and Mitchell were selected to play in the 2020 All-Star Game in Chicago.

On June 4, the Jazz clinched a playoff berth for the fourth straight season, after the NBA approved a plan to return to play in the NBA Bubble with only 22 teams in late July.

In the playoffs, the Jazz lost to the Denver Nuggets in the first round in seven games after leading the series 3–1.

Draft picks

The Jazz held a first and a second-round draft pick entering the 2019 NBA Draft. On the night before the 2019 NBA draft began, the Jazz agreed to trade their first-round pick at #23 (which became forward Darius Bazley), a protected 2020 first-round pick, Grayson Allen, Jae Crowder, and Kyle Korver to the Memphis Grizzlies in exchange for long-standing point guard Mike Conley Jr., although the trade was not official until July 6 due to salary cap reasons.

On the night of the draft, the Jazz selected point guard Justin Wright-Foreman from Hofstra University. They also traded their 2021 second-round pick and cash considerations to the Indiana Pacers for their 50th pick of the draft, which became power forward Jarrell Brantley from the College of Charleston. Both Wright-Foreman and Brantley signed two-way contracts with Utah on July 16. Utah also traded away some cash considerations to the Golden State Warriors on June 20 to acquire the 58th pick of the draft, shooting guard Miye Oni from Yale University.

Roster

Standings

Division

Conference

Game log

Preseason

Regular season

|- style="background:#cfc;"
| 1
| October 23
| Oklahoma City
| 
| Donovan Mitchell (32)
| Rudy Gobert (14)
| Conley Jr., Mudiay (5)
| Vivint Smart Home Arena18,306
| 1–0
|- style="background:#fcc;"
| 2
| October 25
| @ L. A. Lakers
| 
| Donovan Mitchell (24)
| Rudy Gobert (9)
| Joe Ingles (4)
| Staples Center18,997
| 1–1
|- style="background:#cfc;"
| 3
| October 26
| Sacramento
| 
| Bojan Bogdanovic (26)
| Ed Davis (7)
| Mike Conley Jr. (8)
| Vivint Smart Home Arena18,306
| 2–1
|- style="background:#cfc;"
| 4
| October 28
| @ Phoenix
| 
| Bojan Bogdanovic (29)
| Rudy Gobert (18)
| Joe Ingles (5)
| Talking Stick Resort Arena14,805
| 3–1
|- style="background:#cfc;"
| 5
| October 30
| L. A. Clippers
| 
| Mike Conley Jr. (29)
| Ed Davis (9)
| Joe Ingles (7)
| Vivint Smart Home Arena18,306
| 4–1

|- style="background:#fcc;"
| 6
| November 1
| @ Sacramento
| 
| Donovan Mitchell (24)
| Rudy Gobert (16)
| Conley Jr., O'Neale (4)
| Golden 1 Center16,273
| 4–2
|- style="background:#fcc;"
| 7
| November 3
| @ L. A. Clippers
| 
| Donovan Mitchell (36)
| Rudy Gobert (14)
| Donovan Mitchell (6)
| Staples Center19,068
| 4–3
|- style="background:#cfc;"
| 8
| November 6
| Philadelphia
| 
| Donovan Mitchell (24)
| Rudy Gobert (16)
| Donovan Mitchell (8)
| Vivint Smart Home Arena18,306
| 5–3
|- style="background:#cfc;"
| 9
| November 8
| Milwaukee
|
| Bojan Bogdanovic (33)
| Rudy Gobert (17)
| Donovan Mitchell (6)
| Vivint Smart Home Arena18,306
| 6–3
|- style="background:#cfc;"
| 10
| November 11
| @ Golden State
| 
| Rudy Gobert (25)
| Rudy Gobert (14)
| Conley Jr., Ingles (7)
| Chase Center18,064
| 7–3
|- style="background:#cfc;"
| 11
| November 12
| Brooklyn
| 
| Donovan Mitchell (30)
| Rudy Gobert (15)
| Mike Conley Jr. (5)
| Vivint Smart Home Arena18,306
| 8–3
|- style="background:#fcc;"
| 12
| November 15
| @ Memphis
| 
| Donovan Mitchell (29)
| Rudy Gobert (17)
| Donovan Mitchell (5)
| FedExForum16,422
| 8–4
|- style="background:#fcc;"
| 13
| November 18
| Minnesota
| 
| Bojan Bogdanovic (18)
| Rudy Gobert (14)
| Mike Conley Jr. (6)
| Vivint Smart Home Arena18,306
| 8–5
|- style="background:#cfc;"
| 14
| November 20
| @ Minnesota
| 
| Bojan Bogdanovic (30)
| Rudy Gobert (15)
| Mike Conley Jr. (8)
| Target Center13,177
| 9–5
|- style="background:#cfc;"
| 15
| November 22
| Golden State
| 
| Donovan Mitchell (30)
| Rudy Gobert (19)
| Royce O'Neale (5)
| Vivint Smart Home Arena18,306
| 10–5
|- style="background:#cfc;"
| 16
| November 23
| New Orleans
| 
| Donovan Mitchell (37)
| Tony Bradley (9)
| Royce O'Neale (6)
| Vivint Smart Home Arena18,306
| 11–5
|- style="background:#fcc;"
| 17
| November 25
| @ Milwaukee
| 
| Bojan Bogdanovic (24)
| Rudy Gobert (11)
| Mike Conley Jr. (9)
| Fiserv Forum17,385
| 11–6
|- style="background:#fcc;"
| 18
| November 27
| @ Indiana
| 
| Bojan Bogdanovic (30)
| Rudy Gobert (13)
| Mike Conley Jr. (5)
| Bankers Life Fieldhouse17,027
| 11–7
|- style="background:#cfc;"
| 19
| November 29
| @ Memphis
| 
| Bojan Bogdanovic (33)
| Rudy Gobert (13)
| Conley Jr., O'Neale (4)
| FedExForum16,605
| 12–7

|- style="background:#fcc;"
| 20
| December 1
| @ Toronto
| 
| Mike Conley Jr. (20)
| Rudy Gobert (11)
| Royce O'Neale (5)
| Scotiabank Arena18,132
| 12–8
|- style="background:#fcc;"
| 21
| December 2
| @ Philadelphia
| 
| Rudy Gobert (27)
| Rudy Gobert (12)
| Joe Ingles (8)
| Wells Fargo Center20,208
| 12–9
|- style="background:#fcc;"
| 22
| December 4
| L. A. Lakers
| 
| Donovan Mitchell (29)
| Rudy Gobert (10)
| Mitchell, Ingles (5)
| Vivint Smart Home Arena18,306
| 12–10
|- style="background:#cfc;"
| 23
| December 7
| Memphis
| 
| Donovan Mitchell (22)
| Rudy Gobert (11)
| Joe Ingles (10)
| Vivint Smart Home Arena18,306
| 13–10
|- style="background:#fcc;"
| 24
| December 9
| Oklahoma City
| 
| Donovan Mitchell (26)
| Rudy Gobert (17)
| Joe Ingles (8)
| Vivint Smart Home Arena18,306
| 13–11
|- style="background:#cfc;"
| 25
| December 11
| @ Minnesota
| 
| Donovan Mitchell (30)
| Rudy Gobert (16)
| Donovan Mitchell (6)
| Target Center12,369
| 14–11
|- style="background:#cfc;"
| 26
| December 13
| Golden State
| 
| Bojan Bogdanovic (32)
| Rudy Gobert (15)
| Joe Ingles (8)
| Vivint Smart Home Arena18,306
| 15–11
|- style="background:#cfc;"
| 27
| December 17
| Orlando
| 
| Bogdanovic, Mitchell (30)
| Rudy Gobert (19)
| Mike Conley Jr. (6)
| Vivint Smart Home Arena18,306
| 16–11
|- style="background:#cfc;"
| 28
| December 19
| @ Atlanta
| 
| Donovan Mitchell (30)
| Rudy Gobert (13)
| Mitchell, Ingles (5)
| State Farm Arena16,739
| 17–11
|- style="background:#cfc;"
| 29
| December 21
| @ Charlotte
| 
| Bojan Bogdanović (26)
| Rudy Gobert (19)
| Donovan Mitchell (9)
| Spectrum Center16,187
| 18–11
|- style="background:#fcc;"
| 30
| December 23
| @ Miami
| 
| Joe Ingles (27)
| Rudy Gobert (20)
| Donovan Mitchell (7)
| American Airlines Arena19,890
| 18–12
|- style="background:#cfc;"
| 31
| December 26
| Portland
| 
| Donovan Mitchell (35)
| Rudy Gobert (15)
| Donovan Mitchell (7)
| Vivint Smart Home Arena18,306
| 19–12
|- style="background:#cfc;"
| 32
| December 28
| @ L. A. Clippers
| 
| Donovan Mitchell (30)
| Royce O'Neale (10)
| Donovan Mitchell (9)
| Staples Center19,068
| 20–12
|- style="background:#cfc;"
| 33
| December 30
| Detroit
| 
| Donovan Mitchell (23)
| Rudy Gobert (19)
| Joe Ingles (5)
| Vivint Smart Home Arena18,306
| 21–12

|- style="background:#cfc;"
| 34
| January 2
| @ Chicago
| 
| Bojan Bogdanović (19)
| Rudy Gobert (12)
| Joe Ingles (10)
| United Center19,398
| 22–12
|- style="background:#cfc;"
| 35
| January 4
| @ Orlando
| 
| Donovan Mitchell (32)
| Rudy Gobert (17)
| Donovan Mitchell (6)
| Amway Center16,913
| 23–12
|- style="background:#cfc;"
| 36
| January 6
| @ New Orleans
| 
| Bojan Bogdanović (35)
| Rudy Gobert (19)
| Mitchell, Ingles (6)
| Smoothie King Center14,138
| 24–12
|- style="background:#cfc;"
| 37
| January 8
| New York
| 
| Bogdanović, Mudiay (20)
| Rudy Gobert (16)
| Donovan Mitchell (6)
| Vivint Smart Home Arena18,306
| 25–12
|- style="background:#cfc;"
| 38
| January 10
| Charlotte
| 
| Jordan Clarkson (20)
| Rudy Gobert (13)
| Emmanuel Mudiay (6)
| Vivint Smart Home Arena18,306
| 26–12
|- style="background:#cfc;"
| 39
| January 12
| @ Washington
| 
| Bojan Bogdanović (31)
| Rudy Gobert (14)
| Joe Ingles (9)
| Capital One Arena15,953
| 27–12
|- style="background:#cfc;"
| 40
| January 14
| @ Brooklyn
| 
| Joe Ingles (27)
| Rudy Gobert (18)
| Gobert, Mitchell, Ingles, O'Neale (4)
| Barclays Center15,381
| 28–12
|- style="background:#fcc;"
| 41
| January 16
| @ New Orleans
| 
| Donovan Mitchell (46)
| Rudy Gobert (14)
| Joe Ingles (6)
| Smoothie King Center16,717
| 28–13
|- style="background:#cfc;"
| 42
| January 18
| Sacramento
| 
| Bojan Bogdanović (30)
| Rudy Gobert (15)
| Joe Ingles (12)
| Vivint Smart Home Arena18,306
| 29–13
|- style="background:#cfc;"
| 43
| January 20
| Indiana
| 
| Donovan Mitchell (25)
| Rudy Gobert (14)
| Joe Ingles (7)
| Vivint Smart Home Arena18,306
| 30–13
|- style="background:#cfc;"
| 44
| January 22
| @ Golden State
| 
| Donovan Mitchell (23)
| Rudy Gobert (15)
| Joe Ingles (8)
| Chase Center18,064
| 31–13
|- style="background:#cfc;"
| 45
| January 25
| Dallas
| 
| Donovan Mitchell (25)
| Rudy Gobert (17)
| Mitchell, Ingles, Conley Jr. (5)
| Vivint Smart Home Arena18,306
| 32–13
|- style="background:#fcc;"
| 46
| January 27
| Houston
| 
| Donovan Mitchell (36)
| Rudy Gobert (14)
| Joe Ingles (6)
| Vivint Smart Home Arena18,306
| 32–14
|- style="background:#fcc;"
| 47
| January 29
| @ San Antonio
| 
| Donovan Mitchell (31)
| Rudy Gobert (19)
| Mitchell, Ingles, O'Neale, Bogdanović (4)
| AT&T Center17,887
| 32–15
|- style="background:#fcc;"
| 48
| January 30
| @ Denver
| 
| Jordan Clarkson (37)
| Rudy Gobert (11)
| Ingles, Mitchell (8)
| Pepsi Center19,520
| 32–16

|- style="background:#fcc;"
| 49
| February 1
| @ Portland
| 
| Donovan Mitchell (25)
| Rudy Gobert (11)
| Joe Ingles (5)
| Moda Center19,603
| 32–17
|- style="background:#fcc;"
| 50
| February 5
| Denver
| 
| Mike Conley Jr. (21)
| Rudy Gobert (14)
| Joe Ingles (6)
| Vivint Smart Home Arena18,306
| 32–18
|- style="background:#cfc;"
| 51
| February 7
| Portland
| 
| Bojan Bogdanović (27)
| Rudy Gobert (14)
| Donovan Mitchell (7)
| Vivint Smart Home Arena18,306
| 33–18
|- style="background:#cfc;"
| 52
| February 9
| @ Houston
| 
| Jordan Clarkson (30)
| Rudy Gobert (15)
| Joe Ingles (7)
| Toyota Center18,055
| 34–18
|- style="background:#cfc;"
| 53
| February 10
| @ Dallas
| 
| Jordan Clarkson (25)
| Rudy Gobert (16)
| Clarkson, Ingles (8)
| American Airlines Center19,793
| 35–18
|- style="background:#cfc;"
| 54
| February 12
| Miami
| 
| Donovan Mitchell (26)
| Rudy Gobert (20)
| Joe Ingles (9)
| Vivint Smart Home Arena18,306
| 36–18
|- style="background:#fcc;"
| 55
| February 21
| San Antonio
| 
| Gobert, Mudiay (18)
| Rudy Gobert (14)
| Joe Ingles (7)
| Vivint Smart Home Arena18,306
| 36–19
|- style="background:#fcc;"
| 56
| February 22
| Houston
| 
| Donovan Mitchell (31)
| Clarkson, Conley Jr., Mitchell (7)
| Mike Conley Jr. (7)
| Vivint Smart Home Arena18,306
| 36–20
|- style="background:#fcc;"
| 57
| February 24
| Phoenix
| 
| Donovan Mitchell (38)
| Royce O'Neale (9)
| Ingles, Mitchell (4)
| Vivint Smart Home Arena18,306
| 36–21
|- style="background:#fcc;"
| 58
| February 26
| Boston
| 
| Donovan Mitchell (37)
| Rudy Gobert (9)
| Donovan Mitchell (5)
| Vivint Smart Home Arena18,306
| 36–22
|- style="background:#cfc;"
| 59
| February 28
| Washington
| 
| Donovan Mitchell (30)
| Rudy Gobert (9)
| Conley Jr., Ingles (6)
| Vivint Smart Home Arena18,306
| 37–22

|- style="background:#cfc;"
| 60
| March 2
| @ Cleveland
| 
| Bojan Bogdanović (28)
| Gobert, Mitchell (9)
| Joe Ingles (8)
| Rocket Mortgage FieldHouse15,453
| 38–22
|- style="background:#cfc;"
| 61
| March 4
| @ New York
| 
| Bogdanović, Mitchell (23)
| Rudy Gobert (14)
| Donovan Mitchell (8)
| Madison Square Garden16,588
| 39–22
|- style="background:#cfc;"
| 62
| March 6
| @ Boston
| 
| Mike Conley Jr. (25)
| 3 tied (7)
| Joe Ingles (6)
| TD Garden19,156
| 40–22
|- style="background:#cfc;"
| 63
| March 7
| @ Detroit
| 
| Bojan Bogdanović (32)
| Rudy Gobert (12)
| Conley Jr., O'Neale (4)
| Little Caesars Arena16,590
| 41–22
|- style="background:#fcc;"
| 64
| March 9
| Toronto
| 
| Joe Ingles (20)
| Royce O'Neale (7)
| Mike Conley Jr. (7)
| Vivint Smart Home Arena18,306
| 41–23

|- style="background:#cfc;"
| 65
| July 30
| @ New Orleans
| 
| Jordan Clarkson (23)
| Rudy Gobert (12)
| Donovan Mitchell (5)
| HP Field HouseNo In-Person Attendance
| 42–23
|- style="background:#fcc;"
| 66
| August 1
| @ Oklahoma City
| 
| Donovan Mitchell (13)
| Rudy Gobert (7)
| Conley Jr., Ingles, Mitchell (4)
| The ArenaNo In-Person Attendance
| 42–24
|- style="background:#fcc;"
| 67
| August 3
| L. A. Lakers
| 
| Donovan Mitchell (33)
| Gobert, O'Neale (13)
| Mike Conley (8)
| The ArenaNo In-Person Attendance
| 42–25
|- style="background:#cfc;"
| 68
| August 5
| Memphis
| 
| Joe Ingles (25)
| Rudy Gobert (16)
| Mike Conley Jr. (7)
| HP Field HouseNo In-Person Attendance
| 43–25
|- style="background:#fcc;"
| 69
| August 7
| @ San Antonio
| 
| Jordan Clarkson (24)
| Tony Bradley (11)
| Emmanuel Mudiay (5)
| HP Field HouseNo In-Person Attendance
| 43–26
|- style="background:#fcc;"
| 70
| August 8
| @ Denver
| 
| Donovan Mitchell (35)
| Rudy Gobert (13)
| Joe Ingles (13)
| The ArenaNo In-Person Attendance
| 43–27
|- style="background:#fcc;"
| 71
| August 10
| Dallas
| 
| Jordan Clarkson (18)
| Bradley, Gobert (5)
| Joe Ingles (7)
| The ArenaNo In-Person Attendance
| 43–28
|- style="background:#cfc;"
| 72
| August 13
| San Antonio
| 
| Rayjon Tucker (18)
| Tony Bradley (10)
| Jarrell Brantley (6)
| HP Field HouseNo In-Person Attendance
| 44–28

|- style="background:#;"
| 65
| March 11
| @ Oklahoma City
| 
|
|
|
| Chesapeake Energy Arena
|
|- style="background:#;"
| 66
| March 13
| New Orleans
| 
|
|
|
| Vivint Smart Home Arena
|
|- style="background:#;"
| 67
| March 14
| Memphis
| 
|
|
|
| Vivint Smart Home Arena
|
|- style="background:#;"
| 68
| March 16
| LA Lakers
| 
|
|
|
| Vivint Smart Home Arena
|
|- style="background:#;"
| 69
| March 18
| @ LA Lakers
| 
|
|
|
| Staples Center
|
|- style="background:#;"
| 70
| March 20
| Minnesota
| 
|
|
|
| Vivint Smart Home Arena
|
|- style="background:#;"
| 71
| March 22
| @ San Antonio
| 
|
|
|
| AT&T Center
|
|- style="background:#;"
| 72
| March 24
| San Antonio
| 
|
|
|
| Vivint Smart Home Arena
|
|- style="background:#;"
| 73
| March 26
| @ Dallas
| 
|
|
|
| American Airlines Center
|
|- style="background:#;"
| 74
| March 28
| Atlanta
| 
|
|
|
| Vivint Smart Home Arena
|
|- style="background:#;"
| 75
| March 30
| Chicago
| 
|
|
|
| Vivint Smart Home Arena
|
|- style="background:#;"
| 76
| April 1
| Cleveland
| 
|
|
|
| Vivint Smart Home Arena
|
|- style="background:#;"
| 77
| April 2
| @ Portland
| 
|
|
|
| Moda Center
|
|- style="background:#;"
| 78
| April 5
| @ Denver
| 
|
|
|
| Pepsi Center
|
|- style="background:#;"
| 79
| April 7
| LA Clippers
| 
|
|
|
| Vivint Smart Home Arena
|
|- style="background:#;"
| 80
| April 11
| @ Phoenix
| 
|
|
|
| Talking Stick Resort Arena
|
|- style="background:#;"
| 81
| April 13
| @ Oklahoma City
| 
|
|
|
| Chesapeake Energy Arena
|
|- style="background:#;"
| 82
| April 14
| Denver
| 
|
|
|
| Moda Center
|

Playoffs

|- style="background:#fcc;"
| 1
| August 17
| @ Denver
| 
| Donovan Mitchell (57)
| Bradley, Mitchell (9)
| Donovan Mitchell (7)
| HP Field HouseNo in-person attendance
| 0–1
|- style="background:#cfc;"
| 2
| August 19
| @ Denver
| 
| Donovan Mitchell (30)
| Bradley, Gobert, O'Neale (7)
| Mitchell, O'Neale (8)
| The ArenaNo in-person attendance
| 1–1
|- style="background:#cfc;"
| 3
| August 21
| Denver
| 
| Mike Conley Jr. (27)
| Rudy Gobert (14)
| Joe Ingles (8)
| The ArenaNo in-person attendance
| 2–1
|- style="background:#cfc;"
| 4
| August 23
| Denver
| 
| Donovan Mitchell (51)
| Rudy Gobert (11)
| Donovan Mitchell (7)
| The ArenaNo in-person attendance
| 3–1
|- style="background:#fcc;"
| 5
| August 25
| @ Denver
| 
| Donovan Mitchell (30)
| Rudy Gobert (12)
| Conley Jr., Mitchell (5)
| HP Field HouseNo in-person attendance
| 3–2
|- style="background:#fcc;"
| 6
| August 30
| Denver
| 
| Donovan Mitchell (44)
| Rudy Gobert (11)
| Mike Conley Jr. (6)
| The ArenaNo in-person attendance
| 3–3
|- style="background:#fcc;"
| 7
| September 1
| @ Denver
| 
| Donovan Mitchell (22)
| Rudy Gobert (18)
| Mike Conley Jr. (7)
| The ArenaNo in-person attendance
| 3–4

Transactions

Trades

Free agency

Additions

Subtractions

References

Utah Jazz seasons
Utah
Utah Jazz
Utah Jazz